Richard Olney (September 15, 1835 – April 8, 1917) was an American statesman.

He served as United States Attorney General in the cabinet of Grover Cleveland and Secretary of State under Cleveland.

As attorney general, Olney used injunctions against striking workers in the Pullman strike, setting a precedent, and advised the use of federal troops, when legal means failed to control the strikers.

As Secretary of State, he raised the status of America in the world by elevating U.S. diplomatic posts to the status of embassy.

Early life and education 
Olney was born into a prosperous family in Oxford, Massachusetts. His father was Wilson Olney, a textiles manufacturer and banker. Shortly after his birth, the family moved to Louisville, Kentucky, and lived there until Olney was seven. The family then moved back to Oxford and Olney attended school at the Leicester Academy in Leicester, Massachusetts.

He graduated with high honors as class orator from Brown University in 1856. He received a Bachelor of Laws degree from Harvard Law School in 1858.

In 1859, he passed the bar and began practicing law in Boston, attaining a reputation as an authority on probate, trust and corporate law.

Early career 
Olney was elected a selectman in West Roxbury, Massachusetts and served one term in the Massachusetts House of Representatives in 1874. He declined to run again, preferring to return to his law practice.

In 1876, Olney inherited his father-in-law's Boston law practice and became involved in the business affairs of Boston's elite families.

During the 1880s, Olney became one of the Boston's leading railroad attorneys and the general counsel for Chicago, Milwaukee and St. Paul Railway.

Olney was once asked by a former railroad employer if he could do something to get rid of the newly formed Interstate Commerce Commission (ICC). He suggested that the ICC would become a captive regulator, replying in an 1892 letter, "The Commission... is, or can be made, of great use to the railroads. It satisfies the popular clamor for a government supervision of the railroads, at the same time that that supervision is almost entirely nominal. Further, the older such a commission gets to be, the more inclined it will be found to take the business and railroad view of things... The part of wisdom is not to destroy the Commission, but to utilize it."

Attorney General 
In March 1893, Olney became U.S. Attorney General and used the law to thwart strikes, which he considered an illegitimate tactic contrary to law. Olney argued that the government must prevent interference with its mails and with the general railway transportation between the states.

Pullman strike 
During the 1894 Pullman strike, Olney instructed district attorneys to secure from the Federal Courts writs of injunction against striking railroad employees. He ordered the Chicago district attorney to convene a grand jury to find cause to indict Eugene Debs and other labor leaders and sent federal marshals to protect rail traffic, ordering 150 marshals deputized in Helena, Montana alone.

When the legal measures failed, he advised President Cleveland to send federal troops to Chicago to quell the strike, over the objections of the Governor of Illinois.

Secretary of State 
Upon the death of Secretary of State Walter Q. Gresham, Cleveland named Olney to the position on June 10, 1895.

Olney quickly elevated US foreign diplomatic posts to the title of embassy, officially raising the status of the United States to one of the world's greater nations. (Until then, the United States had had only Legations, which diplomatic protocol dictated be treated as inferior to embassies.)

Olney took a prominent role in the boundary dispute between the British and Venezuelan governments. In his correspondence with Lord Salisbury, he gave an extended interpretation of the Monroe Doctrine that went considerably beyond previous statements on the subject, now known as the Olney interpretation.

Later years 
Olney returned to the practice of the law in 1897, at the expiration of Cleveland's term.

In March 1913, Olney turned down President Wilson's offer to be the US Ambassador to Great Britain, and later, in May 1914, when President Wilson offered Olney the Appointment as Governor of the Federal Reserve Board, he declined that appointment.  Olney was unwilling to take on new responsibilities at his advanced age.

Personal life 
In 1861, Olney married Agnes Park Thomas of Boston, Massachusetts.

Olney was the uncle of Massachusetts Congressman Richard Olney II.

Author H.W. Brands recounts claims that Olney "responded to a daughter's indiscretion by banishing her from his home, never to see her again, although they lived in the same city for thirty years."

Honors 
Olney received the honorary degree of LL.D from Harvard and Brown in 1893 and from Yale University in 1901.

References

Bibliography 
 Grenville, John A. S. and George Berkeley Young. Politics, Strategy, and American Diplomacy: Studies in Foreign Policy, 1873-1917 (1966) pp 158–78 on "Grover Cleveland, Richard only, and the Venezuelan crisis"
 Young, George B. "Intervention Under the Monroe Doctrine: The Olney Corollary," Political Science Quarterly, 57#2 (1942), pp. 247–280 in JSTOR

1835 births
1917 deaths
Brown University alumni
Burials at Mount Auburn Cemetery
Harvard Law School alumni
Democratic Party members of the Massachusetts House of Representatives
People from Oxford, Massachusetts
United States Attorneys General
Candidates in the 1904 United States presidential election
20th-century American politicians
United States Secretaries of State
Cleveland administration cabinet members
19th-century American politicians